This is a list of award winners and single-season league leaders for the Baltimore Orioles professional baseball team.

Abbreviations

   P: pitcher
   C: catcher
 1B: first baseman
 2B: second baseman
 3B: third baseman
 SS: shortstop
 LF: left fielder
 CF: center fielder
 RF: right fielder
 IF: infielder
 OF: outfielder
 DH: designated hitter

National Baseball Hall of Fame
See: .

Awards

MVP Award (AL) winners

Note: This was re-named the Kenesaw Mountain Landis Memorial Baseball Award in 1944.
1964: Brooks Robinson
1966: Frank Robinson
1970: Boog Powell
1983: Cal Ripken Jr.
1991: Cal Ripken Jr.

Cy Young Award (AL) winners
1969: Mike Cuellar
1973: Jim Palmer
1975: Jim Palmer
1976: Jim Palmer
1979: Mike Flanagan
1980: Steve Stone

Rookie of the Year Award (AL) winners

Note: This was re-named the Jackie Robinson Award in 1987.
1960: Ron Hansen
1965: Curt Blefary
1973: Al Bumbry
1977: Eddie Murray
1982: Cal Ripken Jr.
1989: Gregg Olson

Manager of the Year Award (AL)

See footnote
1989: Frank Robinson
1997: Davey Johnson
2014: Buck Showalter

Silver Slugger Award (AL) winners

1983: Eddie Murray (1b) – Cal Ripken Jr. (ss)
1984: Eddie Murray (1b) – Cal Ripken Jr. (ss)
1985: Cal Ripken Jr. (ss)
1986: Cal Ripken Jr. (ss)
1989: Cal Ripken Jr. (ss) Mickey Tettleton (C)
1991: Cal Ripken Jr. (ss)
1993: Cal Ripken Jr. (ss)
1994: Cal Ripken Jr. (ss)
1996: Roberto Alomar (2b)
1998: Rafael Palmeiro (1b)
2004: Miguel Tejada (ss) Melvin Mora (3B)
2005: Miguel Tejada
2008: Aubrey Huff (dh)
2013: Chris Davis (1b) – J. J. Hardy (ss) – Adam Jones (cf) 
2016: Mark Trumbo (DH)
2021: Cedric Mullins (CF)

Gold Glove Award (AL) winners

1960: Brooks Robinson (3b)
1961: Brooks Robinson (3b)
1962: Brooks Robinson (3b)
1963: Brooks Robinson (3b)
1964: Brooks Robinson (3b) – Luis Aparicio (ss)
1965: Brooks Robinson (3b)
1966: Brooks Robinson (3b) – Luis Aparicio (ss)
1967: Brooks Robinson (3b) – Paul Blair (of)
1968: Brooks Robinson (3b)
1969: Davey Johnson (2b) – Brooks Robinson (3b) – Mark Belanger (ss)
1970: Davey Johnson (2b) – Brooks Robinson (3b) – Paul Blair (of) 
1971: Davey Johnson (2b) – Brooks Robinson (3b) – Paul Blair (of) – Mark Belanger (ss)
1972: Brooks Robinson (3b) – Paul Blair (of)
1973: Brooks Robinson (3b) – Paul Blair (of) – Bobby Grich (2b) – Mark Belanger (ss)
1974: Brooks Robinson (3b) – Paul Blair (of) – Bobby Grich (2b) – Mark Belanger (ss)
1975: Brooks Robinson (3b) – Paul Blair (of) – Bobby Grich (2b) – Mark Belanger (ss)
1976: Jim Palmer (p) – Bobby Grich (2b) – Mark Belanger (ss) 
1977: Jim Palmer (p) – Mark Belanger (ss)
1978: Jim Palmer (p) – Mark Belanger (ss)
1979: Jim Palmer (p)
1982: Eddie Murray (1b)
1983: Eddie Murray (1b)
1984: Eddie Murray (1b)
1991: Cal Ripken Jr. (ss)
1992: Cal Ripken Jr. (ss)
1996: Mike Mussina (p) – Roberto Alomar (2b)
1997: Mike Mussina (p) – Rafael Palmeiro (1b)
1998: Mike Mussina (p) – Rafael Palmeiro (1b) – Roberto Alomar (2b)
1999: Mike Mussina (p)
2009: Adam Jones (of)
2011: Matt Wieters (c) – Nick Markakis (of)
2012: Adam Jones (of) – Matt Wieters (c) – J. J. Hardy (ss)
2013: Manny Machado (3b) – J. J. Hardy (ss) – Adam Jones (cf)
2014: Nick Markakis (of) Adam Jones (of)
2015: Manny Machado (3b)
2022: Ramón Urías (3b)

Wilson Defensive Player of the Year Award

See explanatory note at Atlanta Braves.
Team (at all positions)
 (2012)
 (2013)

Relief Man of the Year Award
See footnote.
1994: Lee Smith
1997: Randy Myers
2012: Jim Johnson

Mariano Rivera AL Reliever of the Year Award

 2016: Zach Britton

Edgar Martínez Award (designated hitter)
1974: Tommy Davis
2008: Aubrey Huff

Roberto Clemente Award
1972: Brooks Robinson
1982: Ken Singleton
1992: Cal Ripken Jr.
1997: Eric Davis

All-Star Game MVP Award

Note: This was re-named the Ted Williams Most Valuable Player Award in 2002.
1958: Billy O'Dell
1991: Cal Ripken Jr.
2001: Cal Ripken Jr.
2005: Miguel Tejada

All-Star Game — Home Run Derby champion
See: Home Run Derby
1991: Cal Ripken Jr.
2004: Miguel Tejada

DHL Hometown Heroes (2006)
Cal Ripken Jr. – voted by MLB fans as the most outstanding player in the history of the franchise, based on on-field performance, leadership quality and character value

MLB All-Century Team (1999)
3B: Brooks Robinson
SS: Cal Ripken Jr.

MLB All-Time Team (1997; Baseball Writers' Association of America)
Brooks Robinson (first team; third baseman)
Cal Ripken Jr. (first team; shortstop)

The Sporting News (TSN) Player of the Year
1966: Frank Robinson
1983: Cal Ripken Jr.
1991: Cal Ripken Jr.

Sporting News AL Reliever of the Year Award

See footnote

TSN AL Fireman of the Year Award (1960–2000; for closers)

TSN AL Reliever of the Year Award (2001–present; for all relievers)

Hutch Award
1997: Eric Davis

Lou Gehrig Memorial Award
1962: Robin Roberts
1966: Brooks Robinson
1992: Cal Ripken Jr.

Babe Ruth Award (World Series)

: Frank Robinson
: Brooks Robinson
: Rick Dempsey

TSN Manager of the Year Award

Note: Established in 1936, this award was given annually to one manager in Major League Baseball. In 1986 it was expanded to honor one manager from each league.
See footnote
1966: Hank Bauer (in MLB)
1977: Earl Weaver (in MLB)
1979: Earl Weaver (in MLB)
1989: Frank Robinson (in AL)
1993: Johnny Oates (in AL)
1997: Davey Johnson (in AL)
2012: Buck Showalter (in AL)

Associated Press Manager of the Year Award
See: Associated Press Manager of the Year (discontinued in 2001)
See footnote

Baseball America Manager of the Year
See: Baseball America#Baseball America Manager of the Year
Buck Showalter (2012)

Triple Crown Champions

Batting
See: Major League Baseball Triple Crown#Batting Triple Crown winners
1966: Frank Robinson (.316, 49, 122)

Pitching
N/A

Post-Season and All-Star Game MVP Award Winners
World Series MVP
1966: Frank Robinson
1970: Brooks Robinson
1983: Rick Dempsey
AL Championship Series MVP
Note: This was re-named the Lee MacPhail MVP Award.
1983: Mike Boddicker
All-Star Game MVP
Note: This was re-named the Ted Williams Most Valuable Player Award in 2002.
1991: Cal Ripken Jr.
2001: Cal Ripken Jr.
2005: Miguel Tejada

Team award
1966 – American League pennant
 – World Series championship
1969 – William Harridge Trophy (American League champion)
1970 – William Harridge Trophy (American League champion)
 – World Series Trophy
1971 – William Harridge Trophy (American League champion)
1979 – William Harridge Trophy (American League champion)
1983 – William Harridge Trophy (American League champion)
 – World Series Trophy

Team records (single-season and career)

Other achievements

Most Valuable Oriole

1954 – Chuck Diering
1955 – Dave Philley
1956 – Bob Nieman
1957 – Billy Gardner
1958 – Gus Triandos
1959 – Gene Woodling
1960 – Brooks Robinson
1961 – Jim Gentile
1962 – Brooks Robinson
1963 – Stu Miller
1964 – Brooks Robinson
1965 – Stu Miller
1966 – Frank Robinson
1967 – Frank Robinson
1968 – Dave McNally
1969 – Boog Powell
1970 – Boog Powell
1971 – Brooks Robinson, Frank Robinson
1972 – Jim Palmer
1973 – Jim Palmer
1974 – Paul Blair, Mike Cuellar
1975 – Ken Singleton

1976 – Lee May
1977 – Ken Singleton
1978 – Eddie Murray
1979 – Ken Singleton
1980 – Al Bumbry
1981 – Eddie Murray
1982 – Eddie Murray
1983 – Eddie Murray, Cal Ripken Jr.
1984 – Eddie Murray
1985 – Eddie Murray
1986 – Don Aase
1987 – Larry Sheets
1988 – Eddie Murray, Cal Ripken Jr.
1989 – Gregg Olson
1990 – Cal Ripken Jr.
1991 – Cal Ripken Jr.
1992 – Mike Devereaux
1993 – Chris Hoiles
1994 – No award given
1995 – Rafael Palmeiro
1996 – Rafael Palmeiro
1997 – Randy Myers

1998 – Rafael Palmeiro
1999 – B.J. Surhoff
2000 – Delino DeShields
2001 – Jeff Conine
2002 – Rodrigo Lopez
2003 – Jay Gibbons
2004 – Miguel Tejada
2005 – Brian Roberts
2006 – Miguel Tejada
2007 – Nick Markakis
2008 – Aubrey Huff
2009 – Brian Roberts
2010 – Luke Scott
2011 – Adam Jones
2012 – Adam Jones
2013 – Chris Davis
2014 – Nelson Cruz
2015 – Chris Davis
2016 – Manny Machado
2017 – Jonathan Schoop
2018 – Adam Jones
2019 - Trey Mancini

2020 - Anthony Santander
2021 - Cedric Mullins
2022 - Adley Rutschman

Baltimore Orioles Hall of Fame

Retired numbers
See

Ford C. Frick Award recipients
See

Associated Press Athlete of the Year
1966: Frank Robinson
1995: Cal Ripken Jr.

Hickok Belt
See footnote

 1966 – Frank Robinson
 1970 – Brooks Robinson

Sports Illustrated Sportsman of the Year
See: Sportsman of the Year

Single-Season leaders

Hitters
Batting Champions
1966: Frank Robinson (.316)

Home Run Champions
1966: Frank Robinson (49)
1981: Eddie Murray t(22)
2013: Chris Davis (53)
2014: Nelson Cruz (40)
2015: Chris Davis (47)
2016: Mark Trumbo (47)

RBI Champions
1964: Brooks Robinson (118)
1966: Frank Robinson (122)
1976: Lee May (109)
1981: Eddie Murray (78)
2004: Miguel Tejada (150)
2013: Chris Davis (138)

Pitchers
Winning Games leaders

1960: Chuck Estrada (18)
1970: Mike Cuellar – Dave McNally t(24)
1975: Jim Palmer t(23)
1976: Jim Palmer (22)
1977: Jim Palmer t(20)
1979: Mike Flanagan (23)
1980: Steve Stone (25)
1981: Dennis Martínez t(14)
1984: Mike Boddicker (20)
1995: Mike Mussina (19)

Strikeouts leaders
1954: Bob Turley (185)

ERA leaders
1959: Hoyt Wilhelm (2.19)
1973: Jim Palmer (2.40)
1975: Jim Palmer (2.09)
1984: Mike Boddicker (2.79)

Baserunning
Stolen Base Champions
1963: Luis Aparicio (40)
1964: Luis Aparicio (57)
2007: Brian Roberts (50)
2022: Jorge Mateo (35)

See also
Baseball awards
List of MLB awards

References

Awards
Major League Baseball team trophies and awards